New York City's 47th City Council district is one of 51 districts in the New York City Council. It has been represented by Republican Ari Kagan since 2022; Kagan succeeded Mark Treyger, who could not run again in 2021 due to term limits.

Geography
District 47 is based around Coney Island and other parts of Brooklyn's southern shoreline, including Gravesend, Sea Gate, eastern Bensonhurst, and a small section of Bath Beach. Most of Coney Island's attractions, such as the Wonder Wheel, the New York Aquarium, and the Riegelmann Boardwalk, are located within the district.

The district overlaps with Brooklyn Community Boards 11, 13, and 15, and with New York's 8th, 10th, and 11th congressional districts. It also overlaps with the 17th, 22nd, and 23rd districts of the New York State Senate, and with the 45th, 46th, 47th, 48th, and 49th districts of the New York State Assembly.

Recent election results

2021
In 2019, voters in New York City approved Ballot Question 1, which implemented ranked-choice voting in all local elections. Under the new system, voters have the option to rank up to five candidates for every local office. Voters whose first-choice candidates fare poorly will have their votes redistributed to other candidates in their ranking until one candidate surpasses the 50 percent threshold. If one candidate surpasses 50 percent in first-choice votes, then ranked-choice tabulations will not occur.

2017

2013

References

New York City Council districts